Genalguacil is a town and municipality in the province of Málaga, part of the autonomous community of Andalusia in southern Spain. The municipality is situated approximately 45 kilometers from Ronda and 34 km from the city of Estepona. It is located west of the province in the Genal valley. It is one of the populations that make up the region of the Serrania de Ronda. Genalguacil is in the judicial district of Ronda.
 
It has a population of approximately 499 residents. The natives are called Genalguacileños. Its Arabic name Genna - Ahuacir meant Gardens of the Vizier.

Places of interest
An attraction of this town is that it is a "town-museum". Every two years, artists from all over gather here, for a week, doing different pieces of art that then leave permanently exposed in the town streets. Genalguacil is therefore an open-air museum, and walking along cobbled streets finds paintings on the walls, sculptures, carved trunks, etc.; that integrate with the environment (such as a sculpture of a little old lady under a hill, called "Hasta el moño de tanta cuesta" (sick and tired of such slopes). Every detail (house numbers, street names, benches, fireplaces) are finished some something artistic way, making the walk through the streets in a real museum hall.

Other attraction of Genalguacil are some surroundings of high ecological value, where the pinsapo is abundant. It has a large game reserve.

References

Municipalities in the Province of Málaga